Dean is a surname originally derived from the Old English word "denu" (Middle English, "dene") meaning "valley." Another common variant of this surname is Deane. The family originate from counties Wiltshire and Gloucestershire.

Origin and variants 
Dean is thought to be a habitational name from any of several places in various parts of England that are known by a variation of the name. The first bearers of the name lived in Anglo-Saxon England in mountainous or hilly areas where they would have adopted the name as a habitational marker. The surname is historically concentrated in the West Country in South West England, particularly in and around the county of Gloucestershire, and there are several places called Dean in the area (including other areas of Southern England), suggesting that this region may be the surname’s likely area of origin. Dean and Deane are also historically found as surnames in Scotland and Ireland.

Perhaps less likely, it may also be a descriptive name for someone thought to resemble an ecclesiastical Dean, or an occupational name associated with the servant of a Dean, derived from the Middle English word "deen," which is itself ultimately derived from the Latin word "decanus" (modern English, Deacon), meaning "a leader of ten men".

Recorded usage of the name dates back to the late 11th century when it was recorded as the surname of several individuals. The first known person on record to use the Dean surname appears to have been an individual named Robert de Dene, who was a "Pincema", or, an official in charge of wine and beverage for King Edward the Confessor (1042–1066). His descendants, known as Denn or Denne, were landowners in Kent and Sussex, but apparently died out by the 1600s. Another known early Dean was an individual named Ralph De Dene, who was recorded in the Domesday Book for Sussex during the reign of William the Conqueror (1066–1087) in 1086.

The official use of surnames became necessary when governments introduced personal taxation. Until the gradual standardization of English spelling in the last few centuries however, English lacked any comprehensive system of spelling. Consequently, spelling variations in names are frequently found in early Anglo-Saxon and later Anglo-Norman documents, meaning that a person's name was often spelled several different ways over a lifetime. As such, different variations of the Dean surname usually have the same origin.

Notable people with the surname 

Angela Dean, British statistician
Anna-Maria Ravnopolska-Dean, harpist
Ardie Dean (born 1955), American blues drummer, audio engineer and record producer
Austin Dean (born 1993), American baseball player
Bashford Dean, American ornithologist
Billy Dean, American singer
Brenda Dean (1943–2018), British trade unionist and politician
Brett Dean (born 1961), Australian composer
Charlbi Dean (1990–2022), South African actress and model
Charles Dean (died 1974), brother of Howard and Jim
Charmaine Dean (born 1958), statistician from Trinidad, president of Statistical Society of Canada
Christopher Dean, British figure skater
Dean (Middlesex cricketer) (fl. 1787–1790), English amateur cricketer
Diana Dean (born 1942), Canadian artist
Dixie Dean, English footballer
Dizzy Dean (1910–1974), baseball pitcher
Dora Dean (c. 1872–1949), vaudeville dancer
Eddie Dean (disambiguation), several people
Elton Dean, jazz musician
Everett Dean (1898–1993), American college sports coach
Fred Dean (1952–2020), American football player
Gordon Dean (disambiguation), several people
Henry Clay Dean, American orator and author
Howard Dean, U.S. presidential candidate in 2004
Jackson Dean, American singer
Jamel Dean (born 1996), American football player
James Dean (disambiguation), several people
James Dean (1931–1955), American actor
Janet Dean Fodor, American professor of linguistics
Jim Dean (activist), chairman of Democracy for America
Jimmy Dean (1928–2010), American singer and actor
Joe Dean (1930–2013), American basketball player, sportscaster, and sports administrator
John Dean (born 1938), White House counsel to President Nixon and central Watergate figure
Julia Dean (actress, born 1830) (1830–1868), actress
Julia Dean (actress, born 1878) (1878–1952), actress
Kasseem Dean (born 1978), American record producer, rapper, DJ, and songwriter
Kevin Dean (disambiguation), multiple people
Letitia Dean (born 1967), English actress and singer
Madeleine Dean, American politician
Margia Dean, (born 1922), American actress
Mark Dean (swimmer), American swimmer
Matt Dean (born 1966), American politician
Matthew Deane (disambiguation), several people
Mike Dean (disambiguation), multiple people
Millvina Dean (1912–2009), British civil servant, last living survivor of the Titanic disaster
Nakobe Dean (born 2000), American football player
Nathan Dean (1934–2013), American businessman and politician
Nathaniel Dean, Australian actor
Nathaniel W. Dean (1817–1880), American politician
Nelson Dean, American baseball player
Norman Dean, footballer
Oliver Dean (1783–1871), American physician and businessman, founder of Dean College
Paul Dean (disambiguation), multiple people
Ralph Dean (1913–1987), Canadian Anglican cleric
Roger Dean (artist), album cover designer
Ruth Dean (1902–2003), American scholar of Anglo-Norman literature
 Simon Dean, one of the stage names of Mike Bucci, World Wrestling Entertainment wrestler
Theodosia Ann Dean (1819-1843), English missionary
Thomas Dean (disambiguation), several people
Tony Dean (racing driver) (1932–2008), British racing driver
Winton Dean (1916–2013), English musicologist

Fictional Characters
Jason "J.D." Dean, the antagonist of the 1988 teen film Heathers, and it's musical and TV adaptations

See also
 Dean (given name)
 Deane (surname), includes a list of people with surname Deane
 Deen (disambiguation), includes a list of people with surname Deen
 Melody Dean, fictional character in a song by the same name by Amanda Palmer on Theatre Is Evil

References

English-language surnames
Surnames of British Isles origin